In English tort law, a super-injunction is a type of injunction that prevents publication of information that is in issue and also prevents the reporting of the fact that the injunction exists at all. The term was coined by a Guardian journalist covering the 2006 Ivory Coast toxic waste dump controversy that had resulted in Trafigura obtaining a controversial injunction. Due to their very nature media organisations are not able to report who has obtained a super-injunction without being in contempt of court. The term super-injunction has sometimes been used imprecisely in the media to refer to any anonymised privacy injunction preventing publication of private information. Critics of super-injunctions have argued that they stifle free speech, that they are ineffective as they can be breached using the Internet and social media and that the taking out of an injunction can have the unintended consequence of publicising the information more widely, a phenomenon known as the Streisand effect.

Terminology and application
The Neuberger Committee notes that the terminology surrounding privacy injunctions has been used imprecisely and the term "super-injunction" has been used to refer to: 
Injunctions that provide anonymity for one or both parties.
Injunctions that prohibit reporting of the substantive facts and proceedings of a case.
Injunctions that provide anonymity for one or both parties, prohibit reporting of the substantive facts and proceedings of a case and prohibit access to court files.

The committee adopt the definition that a super-injunction is

An anonymised injunction is a type of injunction which restrains a person from publishing information concerning an applicant that is said to be confidential or private. An anonymised injunction differs from a super-injunction as an anonymised injunction does not restrain the publicising or informing of others of the existence of the order and the proceedings. The term "hyper-injunction" has been used to describe a  type of super-injunction that also forbids a person from discussing the issue in question with journalists, lawyers or Members of Parliament. Such injunctions have been criticised as anti-democratic and the former Liberal Democrat MP John Hemming used Parliamentary privilege to reveal the existence of a hyper-injunction surrounding an allegation that the type of paint used in water tanks on some passenger ships could break down and release toxic chemicals.

Super-injunctions are also applied in Northern Ireland. In January 2020, it was reported that seven super-injunctions were in effect.

Cases
Due to their very nature it is not possible to say exactly how many super-injunctions exist or have been issued. The Neuberger Committee that examined super-injunctions stated:
"at present, there are records of only a limited number of cases; specific records are not at present kept in respect of such matters". The Neuberger Committee report does not specify how many have been granted in the past but does state that only two super-injunctions had been granted since the John Terry case: Ntuli v Donald [2010] EWCA Civ 1276) and DFT v TFD [2010] EWHC 2335 (QB). The Daily Telegraph have reported that 12 super-injunctions exist. Below are known super-injunctions that have become public:

Several cases have been inaccurately described as super-injunctions in the media. These include:

Disclosure
There are several ways in which the public can learn of a super-injunction:

Criticism
Super-injunctions have been criticised on various grounds including that they stifle free speech, are ineffective and risk drawing further attention to an issue. The Daily Mirror newspaper have criticised super-injunctions as existing only for an elite highlighting a poll that 79% of people believe super-injunctions exist for the rich and powerful alone. Super-injunctions have also been criticised on feminist grounds with Maeve Mckeown arguing that "superinjunction allows rich men to legally protect their reputations at the expense of less-rich women".

See also
DSMA-Notice
Privacy in English law

References

External links
Guardian list of injunctions

English privacy law
Mass media in England
Secrecy
Injunctions in English law
Censorship in the United Kingdom